Passing Over in Silence Towards Nuit is the third studio album by Aurora Sutra, released on October 14, 1996 by Sound Factory.

Track listing

Personnel 
Adapted from Passing Over in Silence Towards Nuit liner notes.

Aurora Sutra
 Patricia Nigiani – lead vocals, arrangements

Additional performers
 Eric Burton – vocals (1, 5)
 Ian Christ – acoustic guitars (1, 4), bass guitar (1)
 Anja Schmittler – violin (1)
 Tippy-A-Go-Go – percussion (2, 3, 5, 7, 8), vocals (2, 5, 6, 7), bottles (2, 7), guitar (5, 8), recorder (2), drum guitar (3), backing vocals (3), bass guitar (8)

Production and design
 Rodney Orpheus – production
 Matthias Rewig – mastering

Release history

References

External links 
 Passing Over in Silence Towards Nuit at Discogs (list of releases)
 Passing Over in Silence Towards Nuit at iTunes

1996 albums
Aurora Sutra albums